The 1989–90 season was FC Lokomotiv Gorna Oryahovitsa's fourth season in A PFG.

First-team squad 

 22/0
 29/0
 27/0 
 29/0
 27/4
 19/1
 26/2
 26/5
 3/0
 3/0
 29/3
 1/0

 5/0
 17/0
 22/2
 8/0
 30/9
 12/0
 10/0
 6/0 
 1/1
 14/0
 9/0

Fixtures

League

The team is finished 8th after 30 games in his fourth "A"group's season.

League standings

References

External links
  1989–90 A PFG
 Lokomotiv Gorna Oryahovitsa official website

FC Lokomotiv Gorna Oryahovitsa seasons
Lokomotiv Gorna Oryahovitsa